Phiala albidorsata is a moth in the family Eupterotidae. It was described by Max Gaede in 1927. It is found in Botswana, Mozambique, Zambia and Zimbabwe.

References

Moths described in 1927
Eupterotinae